This is a list of notable events in Latin music (music from the Spanish- and Portuguese-speaking areas of Latin America, Latin Europe, and the United States) that took place in 1987.

Events 
February 24The 29th Annual Grammy Awards are held at The Shrine Auditorium in Los Angeles, California.:
José Feliciano wins the Grammy Award for Best Latin Pop Performance for "Le Lo Lai".
Flaco Jiménez wins the Grammy Award for Best Mexican/Mexican-American Performance for Ay Te Dejo en San Antonio y Más!.
Rubén Blades wins the Grammy Award for Best Tropical Latin Performance for Escenas.

Bands formed

Bands reformed

Bands disbanded

Bands on hiatus

Number-ones albums and singles by country 
List of number-one albums of 1987 (Spain)
List of number-one singles of 1987 (Spain)
List of number-one Billboard Latin Pop Albums of 1987
List of number-one Billboard Regional Mexican Albums of 1987
List of number-one Billboard Tropical Albums of 1987
List of number-one Billboard Top Latin Songs of 1987

Awards 
1987 Tejano Music Awards

Albums released

First quarter

January

February

March

Second quarter

May

June

July

Third quarter

September

Fourth quarter

October

November

Dates unknown

Best-selling records

Best-selling albums
The following is a list of the top 5 best-selling Latin albums of 1987 in the United States divided into the categories of Latin pop, Regional Mexican, and Tropical/salsa, according to Billboard.

Best-performing songs
The following is a list of the top 10 best-performing Latin songs in the United States in 1987, according to Billboard.

Births

Deaths 
November 28Víctor Yturbe, Mexican ballad singer, shot

References 

 
Latin music by year